Théniet El Had is a Town, District and Commune in Algeria. It is located near the Théniet El Had National Park.

Communes of Tissemsilt Province